Waterford Mills is an unincorporated community in Elkhart Township, Elkhart County, Indiana.

History
A gristmill was built on the east side of the Elkhart River in 1833, and the village that grew around it was called Waterford. A post office called Waterford Mills was established in 1853, and remained in operation until it was discontinued in 1904.

Geography

References

Unincorporated communities in Elkhart County, Indiana
Unincorporated communities in Indiana